Baydarlı (also, Baydarly) is a village and municipality in the Qakh Rayon of Azerbaijan.  It has a population of 368.

Notable natives 

 Mammad Mammadov — Hero of the Soviet Union.

References 

Populated places in Qakh District